Following is a list of notable restaurants known for serving cuisine of the Southern United States:

 Acadia: A New Orleans Bistro, Portland, Oregon, U.S.
 Baes Fried Chicken, Portland, Oregon
 Big Spring Cafe
 Biscuit Bitch, Seattle
 Bridges Cafe (1994–2020), Portland, Oregon
 CHAR No.4
 The Country Cat, Portland, Oregon
 Country Cookin
 Cracker Barrel
 Delta Cafe (1995), Portland, Oregon
 Dirty Lettuce (2020), Portland, Oregon
 Erica's Soul Food (2020), Portland, Oregon
 Lambert's Cafe
 Mary Mac's Tea Room
 Nacheaux, West Linn, Oregon (previously Portland, Oregon)
 Screen Door, Portland, Oregon
 Smithfields Restaurant and Bar, Ashland, Oregon
 Upperline Restaurant
 Willie's Place
 Yonder (2019–2022), Portland, Oregon

References

Southern